Libre-SOC is a libre soft processor core originally written by Luke Leighton and other contributors, announced at the OpenPOWER Summit NA 2020. It adheres to the Power ISA 3.0 instruction set and can be run on FPGA boards, currently booting MicroPython and other bare-metal applications.

The purpose of Libre-SOC is to be a system on a chip (SoC) with 3D and video capability built-in as part of the Power ISA, suitable for single-board computers, netbooks, IoT devices and other small form factors, while retaining a completely free and open design.

History 
Libre-SOC began its life when Luke Leighton wanted there to be a completely free and libre system on a chip offering. He initially opted for a RISC-V base, but later switched to OpenPOWER when that seemed like a better fit for the project. It is the second processor written from scratch using the OpenPOWER ISA 3.0, and the first libre core that is completely independent of IBM.

The project is mostly funded through NLnet grants.

While being developed as a "soft core" Libre-SOC will be fabricated in 180 nm by TSMC's "Open MPW Shuttle Program" through Imec in 2021. The finished ASIC was sent to Imec in July 2021.

Design 
Libre-SOC is a 64-bit bi-endian scalar processor core, implementing a subset of the Power ISA 3.0 instruction set. It has 32× 64-bit general purpose registers. It uses Wishbone for the memory interface.

The Libre-SOC core will be a hybrid design, based around a precise-augmented version of the historic CDC 6600 microarchitecture, merging traditional general purpose, vector and graphics computing into a single execution unit reducing complexity and size of the complete chip as well as simplifying 3D driver development. This constitutes the need to add a small addition to the OpenPOWER instruction set architecture called "Simple-V".
SVP64, currently in draft, extends OpenPOWER register files to 128, including CR fields, in order to cope with modern 3D and Video workloads, effectively making Libre-SOC a Vector processor.

Like Microwatt, the initial development was done in around three months, included the entire integer processing functionality of the instruction set; the bare minimum to make it compliant, with no memory management unit and no floating-point unit. Libre-SOC's rapid development is, like Microwatt, down to the significant use of software engineering practices including thousands of unit tests and by Microwatt source code as a reference design.

Libre-SOC is unusual in that it is designed using nMigen, a Python-based hardware description language (HDL).  Also, to retain full transparency associated with "libre", the ASIC layout is performed with coriolis2, a VLSI toolchain developed and maintained by Sorbonne University's Laboratoire d'Informatique de Paris 6.

Hardware implementation 

While Libre-SOC is as developed as a libre software project, eventually the goal is to produce real "hard" hardware products as opposed to the "soft" synthesised versions that reflects the actual development.

The first hard version of the Libre-SOC is fabricated by TSMC on their 180 nm node. The chip comprises 130.000 logic gates, measures 5.5 × 5.9 mm2 and will be packaged in a 128 pin QFP package.

See also
 OpenPOWER Foundation
 IBM Power microprocessors
 List of open-source computing hardware

References

External links 
 Libre-SOC's official page
 Libre-SOC source code
 OpenPOWER list of Libre/Open implementations of the POWER ISA
 Articles about Libre-SOC

Open microprocessors
Libre-SOC
Soft microprocessors
Libre-SOC